Ugyen Dorji is a Bhutanese politician who has been Minister for Labour and Human Resources since November 2018. He has been a member of the National Assembly of Bhutan, since October 2018.

Early life and education
Dorji was born .

He received a Master's degree in public policy from Lee Kuan Yew School of Public Policy, Singapore. He completed his Bachelor of Arts in English and Dzongkha from Sherubtse College, Bhutan.

Professional career
Before entering politics, he was the Desk officer at SAARC and Research assistant at Institute of water policy, Lee Kuan Yew School of Public Policy, National University of Singapore from 2016 to 2017. He has worked in the ministry of foreign affairs from 2013 to 2018. He was also a reporter at The Journalist in 2011.

Political career
Dorji is a member of Druk Nyamrup Tshogpa (DNT).

He was elected to the National Assembly of Bhutan in the 2018 elections for the Thrimshing constituency. He received 2,646 votes and defeated Chenga Tshering, a candidate of Druk Phuensum Tshogpa.

On 3 November, Lotay Tshering formally announced his cabinet structure and Dorji was named as Minister for Labour and Human Resources. On 7 November 2018, he was sworn in as Minister for Labour and Human Resources in the cabinet of Prime Minister Lotay Tshering.

References 

Living people
Bhutanese politicians
1986 births
Sherubtse College alumni
National University of Singapore alumni
Bhutanese MNAs 2018–2023
Lotay Tshering ministry
Druk Nyamrup Tshogpa politicians
Druk Nyamrup Tshogpa MNAs